Bartholomew of Messina was a Sicilian scholar who worked as a translator of Greek into Latin at the court of King Manfred of Sicily.

Life
Almost nothing is known about Bartholomew's life beyond what can be deduced from the formulaic incipit that appears at the start of most of his translations: "Here begins the book ___, translated from Greek into Latin by master Bartholomew of Messina at the court of the most illustrious Manfred, most serene king of Sicily, lover of science, by his command." Three translations ascribed to Bartholomew do not have this formula, which may indicate that they were not made for Manfred.

In a letter to the masters of the University of Paris, Manfred refers to his translators without naming them. Other than Bartholomew, only Stephen of Messina can be certainly associated with his court. Other translators who may have worked for Manfred include William of Luna, Joannes de Dumpno and the anonymous translator of the Tacuinum sanitatis. It has been suggested, on account of his prominence among the identifiable translators of Manfred, that he was the head of the translation school. For the same reason, a reference in Roger Bacon to "the translator of Manfred" is usually taken to refer to Bartholomew.

Works
Bartholomew's translations are highly literal, sometimes to the point that his Latin makes little sense. Although this led Roger Bacon to criticize his translations, it has value to modern scholars critically editing the often imperfectly preserved Greek texts. Bartholomew's translation of the De signis of Theophrastus of Eresus is valuable because it is older than the oldest extant Greek manuscript. It survives in ten manuscripts and was printed four times in the sixteenth century. Likewise, his translation of Theophrastus's De principiis depends on a lost Greek text tradition and is useful for a reconstruction of the Greek text. It is preserved in one manuscript. Dimitri Gutas calls Bartholomew a "literal and slavish translator".

Bartholomew's translation of the Hieroclean treatise of the Hippiatrica is preserved in nine manuscript. It was translated into Sicilian. It is not clear if he worked from an independent text of Hierocles' treatise or if he excerpted from the Hippiatrica. His arrangement of chapters appears to be a novelty.

List of translations
The following works were translated by Bartholomew for Manfred, except where noted:

Aristotle
Rhetorica
De partibus animalium

(Pseudo-)Hippocrates
De natura hominis
De natura puerorum

Pseudo-Aristotle
Problemata physica
De mirabilibus auscultationibus
Physiognomonica
De mundo
De coloribus
Magna moralia

(Pseudo-)Hierocles
part of the Hippiatrica

Theophrastus of Eresus
De signis
De principiis

Notes

Bibliography

People from Messina
13th-century translators
Greek–Latin translators